CB Insights is a private company with a business analytics platform and global database that provides market intelligence on private companies and investor activities. The platform is targeted at private equity, venture capital, investment banking, angel investing, and consulting professionals by providing insights about high growth private companies.

Founding 
CB Insights was founded on January 1, 2008, by Anand Sanwal, and Jonathan Sherry and is headquartered in New York. CB Insights uses a combination of big data tools and algorithms, as well as sentiment analysis on publicly available signals to gather and analyze data about private companies, investors, and industries.

Funding 
The company has raised capital in three rounds of funding with the most recent one being $10 million in series A funding raised in 2015, led by the growth stage investment firm RSTP. The company had previously raised $1.15 million in grants from the National Science Foundation for its private company scoring software, called Mosaic.

Clients and partners 
Some of CB Insights clients include Cisco, Salesforce, Castrol, Gartner, as well as top-tier VCs including, NEA, Upfront Ventures, RRE, and FirstMark Capital. The company periodically partners with companies such as The New York Times Company, and Pricewaterhouse Coopers,  to generate reports on the health of private companies, growth startups, and venture capital across industries.

CB Insights' primary competitors include Crunchbase, and Owler.

CB Insights AI 100 
Since 2017, CB Insights publishes the annual global rating of companies in artificial intelligence classified into multiple categories. This rating is considered to be very prestigious with ranked companies often issuing press releases. The rating is commonly used by the venture capitalists and large corporate partners to identify investment opportunities.

Winners of 2022: https://research-assets.cbinsights.com/2022/05/18100414/AI-100-MM-2022-V9.png

Winners of 2021: https://research-assets.cbinsights.com/2021/05/03185016/AI-100-export-min.png

Winners of 2020: https://research-assets.cbinsights.com/2020/03/06102351/100-AI-startups-to-watch-in-2020_CB-Insights_AI-100.png

Winners of 2019: https://research-assets.cbinsights.com/2019/02/01125325/AI-100-2019-2.png

Winners of 2018: https://research-assets.cbinsights.com/2017/12/12124740/2018-AI-100-Market-Map.png

Winners of 2017: https://research-assets.cbinsights.com/2017/06/08001719/AI_100_market_map_2017-NEW.png

Acquisitions 
The company announced acquisition of VentureSource data assets from Dow Jones & Company on July 15, 2020. The assets will add to the company's private market coverage capabilities.

References

Market intelligence
Knowledge bases
Online companies of the United States
Internet properties established in 2008
Startup databases
Companies based in New York City
Business intelligence companies
2008 establishments in the United States